Events from the year 1846 in Sweden

Incumbents
 Monarch – Oscar I

Events
28 June: The Church of Sweden Härnösand Cathedral is inaugurated.
 December 22 - The guild system in Sweden is abolished by the Fabriks och Handtwerksordning and Handelsordningen.
 Trade and craft professions are opened to all unmarried women.
 Adolf Eugene von Rosen and Georg Theodor Policron von Chiewitz proposes a regulation of Gamla stan.
 The Swedish History Museum is founded. 
 Gothenburg becomes the first Swedish city to be lit up by voal gas. 
 Den broderade plånboken by August Blanche
 Dubbelgångaren av Fjodor Dostojevskij
 Engelbrekt och hans dalkarlar by August Blanche
 Läkaren by August Blanche
 Magister Bläckstadius eller giftermåls-annonsen by August Blanche
 Rika morbror by August Blanche
 Syskonbarnen eller Hofgunst och Folkgunst by Karl Kullberg
 Torparen och hans omgifning by Sophie von Knorring

Births
 26 February – Amanda Forsberg, ballerina
 16 March – Gösta Mittag-Leffler, mathematician   (died 1927)  
 28 April – Johan Oskar Backlund, astronomer   (died 1916) 
 5 May – Lars Magnus Ericsson,  inventor, entrepreneur and founder of telephone equipment manufacturer Ericsson (incorporated as Telefonaktiebolaget LM Ericsson   (died 1926) 
 May - Nanna Hoffman factory owner (died 1920)
 22 December – Andreas Hallén, composer, conductor and music teacher   (died 1925)

Deaths
 28 January - Sara Wacklin, writer and educator (born 1790)
 8 April - Augusta von Fersen, courtier (born 1754)
 2 November – Esaias Tegnér, poet (born 1782)
 18 December – Emilie Högqvist, actress and royal mistress (born 1812)
 Helena Spinacuta, actor and acrobat (born 1766)

References

 
Years of the 19th century in Sweden
Sweden